
Year 172 BC was a year of the pre-Julian Roman calendar. At the time it was known as the Year of the Consulship of Laenas and Ligus (or, less frequently, year 582 Ab urbe condita). The denomination 172 BC for this year has been used since the early medieval period, when the Anno Domini calendar era became the prevalent method in Europe for naming years.

Events 
 By place 
 Greece 
 Eumenes II of Pergamum travels to Rome to warn the Roman Senate of the danger from Perseus of Macedon. On his return from Rome, Eumenes II is nearly killed at Delphi and Perseus is suspected of being the instigator.

 Seleucid Empire 
 Since the reign of the Seleucid king, Antiochus III, the Jewish inhabitants of Judea enjoy extensive autonomy under their high priest. However, they are divided into two parties, the orthodox Hasideans (Pious Ones) and a reform party that favours Hellenism. Antiochus IV supports the reform party because of the financial support they provide him with. In return for a considerable payment, he has permitted the high priest, Jason, to build a gymnasium in Jerusalem and to introduce the Greek mode of educating young people. Jason's time as high priest is brought to an abrupt end when he sends Menelaus, the brother of Simon the Benjamite, to deliver money to Antiochus IV. Menelaus takes this opportunity to "outbid" Jason for the priesthood, resulting in Antiochus IV confirming Menelaus as the High Priest.

 Carthage 
 The peace treaty at the end of the Second Punic War requires that all border disputes involving Carthage be arbitrated by the Roman Senate and requires Carthage to get explicit Roman approval before going to war. As a result, envoys from Carthage appear before the Roman Senate to request resolution of a boundary dispute with Numidia. The dispute is decided in Numidia's favour.

Deaths 
 Quintus Fulvius Flaccus, Roman consul and general
 Xiahou Ying, Chinese official and minister coachman

References